Iolaus parasilanus, the friendly sapphire, is a butterfly in the family Lycaenidae. It is found in Ghana, Nigeria, Gabon, the Republic of the Congo, Angola, the Democratic Republic of the Congo, Uganda, Kenya and Tanzania. The habitat consists of forests.

The larvae feed on Loranthus species, Phragmanthera usuiensis usuiensis, Phragmanthera polycrypta and Phragmanthera brieyi.

Subspecies
Iolaus parasilanus parasilanus (Democratic Republic of the Congo: South Kivu, western Tanzania)
Iolaus parasilanus divaricatus (Riley, 1928) (Uganda, western Kenya, north-western Tanzania, Democratic Republic of Congo: Uele, Ituri, North Kivu and Tshopo)
Iolaus parasilanus mabillei (Riley, 1928) (Gabon, Congo, Angola: Cabinda, Democratic Republic of the Congo: Equateur)
Iolaus parasilanus maesseni (Stempffer & Bennett, 1958) (Ghana, Nigeria: south and the Cross River loop)

References

Butterflies described in 1914
Iolaus (butterfly)